Ray Baker (born July 9, 1948) is an American theater, television and film actor. Baker was born in Omaha, Nebraska. He is a long time character actor with over 100 credits on television and film. Baker is credited either as Ray or Raymond. He grew up in Denver, Colorado and graduated from the University of Denver, before moving to New York and living and working there for twenty years. Baker appeared on and off Broadway and in regional theatre. He currently lives in Los Angeles, is married to actress and playwright Colleen Dodson, and continues working in theatre, movies, and television.

Personal life
Baker married fellow actor Patricia Richardson in 1982. They had three children together: Henry Richardson Baker (born on February 22, 1985), and twins Roxanne Elizabeth Baker and Joe Castle Baker (born on January 3, 1991), before they divorced in 1995. He married another actress, Colleen Dodson-Baker, in 1997.

Film

Television

Broadway

References

External links

 (credited as Ray Baker)
 (additional credits as Raymond Baker)

1948 births
American male film actors
American male stage actors
American male television actors
20th-century American male actors
21st-century American male actors
Living people
Male actors from Omaha, Nebraska
University of Denver alumni